The Christian Life Movement (CLM; , MVC) is a lay ecclesial movement, founded in 1985, in Peru. At that time, a number of initiatives from members of the Sodalitium Christianae Vitae had already begun. Luis Fernando Figari, the Founder of the Sodalitium, conceived the idea of gathering those people and initiatives together in an ecclesiastic movement. The Christian Life Movement forms part of the Sodalit Family, which shares a common spirituality, called the Sodalit spirituality.

"The spirituality of CLM, which offers its members a personal and community-based process of ongoing formation, is characterised by devotion to the Immaculate Conception, an intense participation in liturgical life, meditation on the Word of God as the light to direct their lives and as the key to a critical reading of human projects."

Figaro told an interviewer: "The ecclesial movements, such as CLM —each with own traits and style— offer ambits of Christian life where people deepen their adhesion to the Lord Jesus. Therefore, in the CLM one can: deepen, live and celebrate one's faith, discover the wonders and gifts of God, express charitable solidarity, strive to give glory to God with one's everyday life, share paths and faith experiences with their peers who are searching —hungry for the Bread of Life, thirsting for the Living Water that satisfies the deepest longings of the human being. In the center of the CLM member's faith experience lies the aspiration (I) to live holiness, (II) to commit with ardor to the apostolate, and (III) to serve God and fellow brothers and sisters with generous and fraternal donation. These three dimensions are an expression of the vision of the Christian Life Movement for its way of living the faith of the Church, and its contribution to the construction of a Civilization of Love in the world."

Following investigation of sexual and psychological abuse of members, including children, of the Sodalitium Christianae Vitae by the founder of the SCV and the CLM, Luis Fernando Figari, and other Sodalites, the CLM was also subject to heavy criticism over cases of abuse within it.

History
The Christian Life Movement was founded in 1985 in Lima, Peru by Luis Fernando Figari. "University Missions", later called "Missionary Action", began in 1978, and today forms part of the Christian Life Movement under the name of CLM Missions. This is an apostolic service in which young people live communally and share spiritually and materially in rural and marginalised urban areas affected by poverty.

The first project outside Peru was founded in 1986 at the invitation of Cardinal Eugenio de Araújo Sales, Archbishop of Rio de Janeiro, Brazil, in the favelas (shanty-towns) of Our Lady of Guidance (Nossa Senhora da Guia) parish, where among the first parishioners to form groups were married couples, who now form part of the Family of Nazareth association of Christian Life Movement. The Bethany association began for adult women the following year.

In 1990 CLM was recognized by the Peruvian Bishops' Conference as a national association and gradually spread to other countries of Latin America. On March 23, 1994, the Pontifical Council for the Laity granted CLM recognition as an international association of the faithful of pontifical right. "CLM aims to be a community forum for encountering the Lord Jesus Christ, which fosters an authentic Christian life by announcing and bearing witness to the faith and the comprehensive advancement of the human person in the light of the Gospel and the Magisterium of the Church."

At its Third Plenary Assembly in 2009, it was announced that CLM would place a new emphasis in its apostolic work on the promotion of life, dignity and the rights of the human person, in addition to its four core areas of evangelization of the young, commitment to solidarity with the poor, the sick and the elderly and abandoned children; the evangelization of the culture and the protection of the family.

Organization

The CLM is directed by a General Coordinator, who is in charge of a General Council of Coordination, made up of the general coordinator, the spiritual assistant and the executive secretary. The current General Coordinator is Alexandre Borges. As of 2006, CLM had a membership of about 25,000 in 21 countries, in Asia, Europe, North America and South America.

Its members participate in various associations, such as:
 Bethlehem Groups, for children
 Marian Groups, for youth and young adults
 Bethany Groups, for adult women
 Emmaus Groups, for adult men
 Nazareth Groups, for married couples

At the local level the CLM is organized in apostolic centers.

Apostolic activities
One of the many activities started by members of the Christian Life Movement is "Crece". The first program began in Chile and is called CreceChile. It was founded in 2005 by a group of young Catholic university students who sought to promote the integral growth of the human person through educational projects. Later, this initiative became a non-profit organization that seeks to support disadvantaged families through education. It is currently active in Chile, Argentina and Colombia.

See also
Luis Fernando Intriago Páez
Sodalitium Christianae Vitae 
Sodalit Family

References

External links
 

International associations of the faithful